La Tronche is a commune in the Isère department, southeastern France. It is part of the Grenoble urban unit (agglomeration).

The  is the main hospital of the French Alps.

The French archaeologist and hellenist Henri Metzger (1912–2007) was born in La Tronche. Also hailing from the town is the Member of Parliament Camille Galliard-Minier.

Population

See also
Communes of the Isère department

References

Tronche
Isère communes articles needing translation from French Wikipedia